Oliver Strunz (born 14 June 2000) is an Austrian professional footballer who plays as a forward for Rapid Wien II.

Career
Strunz began playing football at the youth academy of First Vienna, and Rapid Wien. He began his senior career with Rapid Wien II in 2018. He signed a professional contract with Rapid Wien on 20 March 2021, keeping him at the club until June 2024. He made his professional debut with Rapid Wien in a 4–1 Austrian Football Bundesliga to Wolfsberger AC on 7 November 2021, coming on as a late substitute in the 91st minute.

International career
Strunz is a youth international for Austria, having represented the Austria U17s, U18s, and U21s.

Career statistics

References

External links
 
 OEFB Profile

2000 births
Living people
Austrian footballers
Austria youth international footballers
Austria under-21 international footballers
SK Rapid Wien players
Austrian Football Bundesliga players
2. Liga (Austria) players
Austrian Regionalliga players
Association football forwards